= Ye Wenfu =

Chinese poet (born 1944)

- 叶文福
- Born: China

Ye Wenfu is a Chinese poet born in 1944. He worked in the military and was later "struggled" against and criticized by officials. He has been critical of communist policies and officials. He wrote the satirical poem General, you can't do this. In 1985, Ye left the army.

Ye was imprisoned for 17 months after the 1989 Tiananmen Square protests and massacre. He contributed to Mao's Harvest: Voices from China's New Generation.
